This is a list of the fastest-selling product superlatives. The definition of "fastest-selling" typically refers to sales results in the first week of a product's release, (i.e., which product had the biggest launch). Sometimes, rather than comparing sales figures relative to time, the target to be reached is fixed (e.g. sales at 5 million units), and the comparison is based upon how many weeks it takes to reach it (e.g. 52 weeks vs. 56 weeks).

Books 
 2007 Book – Harry Potter and the Deathly Hallows by J. K. Rowling selling approximately 15 million copies worldwide in its first day.
 1992 Book – Sex by Madonna sold about 1.5 million copies in its three first days worldwide, becoming the fastest and best-selling coffee-table book in publishing history.

Cars 
 2014 Car – Tesla, Inc. Model X having advanced sales of over $40 million without any advertising.
 2012 Car (US) – Toyota Prius c was the fastest selling car model of 2012.
 2012 Hybrid Vehicle – Ford C-Max Hybrid is the fastest selling hybrid vehicle ever made by Ford.

Consumer electronics 
 2010 Gaming Peripheral – Kinect selling 8 million units in its first 60 days on sale.
 2010 Operating System – Windows 7 selling over 90 million licenses in around 4 months.
 2010 Reader Device – Barnes & Noble Product Nook titles were sold and downloaded almost a million times on Christmas Day alone.

Film

Box office

Home media 

 Aladdin (1992), upon its home video release on VHS in 1993, sold  copies in three days, setting the fastest sales record for a home video release.
 The Lion King (1994), upon its VHS release in 1995, sold  tapes on its first day of release.
 Extraction (2020), in its first 28 days of release on Netflix, was watched by  member accounts, the highest ever for a film on the streaming service.

Music

Album

2022 Album (SK) – Proof by BTS selling 2.75 million copies in its first week.
2021 Album (SK) – Butter by BTS selling 1.97 million copies in its first week.
2020 Album (SK) – Map of the Soul: 7 by BTS selling 3.37 million copies in its first week.
2019 Album (SK) – Map of the Soul: Persona by BTS selling 2.13 million copies in its first week.
2018 Album (SK) – Love Yourself: Tear by BTS selling 1 million copies in its first week.
2015 Album (UK) – 25 by Adele selling 800,307 units in its first week.
 2015 Album (US) – 25 by Adele selling 3,378,000 units in its first week.
 2012 Album (UK) – Unorthodox Jukebox by Bruno Mars selling 136,000 copies in 1 week.
 2006 Album (UK) – Whatever People Say I Am, That's What I'm Not by indie rock band Arctic Monkeys selling over 360,000 copies in its first week.
 2001 Album (Japan) – Distance by Hikaru Utada selling 3,002,720 units in its first week.
 1990 Album (US) – To the Extreme by Vanilla Ice peaking at #1, staying on the charts for 16 weeks, and selling eleven million copies.
 1964 Album (US) – John Fitzgerald Kennedy—A Memorial Album, recorded on the day of John F. Kennedy's assassination, sold 4 million copies at 99 cents each within six days of its release.

Single
 1997 Single (US) – "Candle in the Wind 1997" by Elton John selling 3.5 million copies in its first week.
 1997 Single (UK) – "Candle in the Wind 1997" by Elton John selling 1.5 million copies in its first week.
 2002 Single (UK) – Anything is Possible/Evergreen by Will Young selling 1.11 million copies in its first week.
 1964 Single (US) – Can't Buy Me Love by The Beatles selling 940,225 copies in its first day.
 2012 Single (UK) –  "Impossible" by James Arthur selling 490,000 copies on 1 week.

Concerts

 2022 World Tour – Bad Bunny sold 480,000 tickets in less than a week.
 2019 Concert (UK) – BTS at Wembley Stadium sold out (60,000 tickets) within 90 minutes.
 2019 Concert (Brazil) – BTS at Allianz Parque sold out (50,000 tickets) in 75 minutes.
 2018 Concert (US) – BTS at Citi Field sold out (40,000 tickets) in 20 minutes.
 2017 Concert (South Korea) - G-Dragon at Seoul World Cup Stadium sold out (65,000 tickets) in 8 minutes.
 2016 Concert (Japan) - TVXQ at Tokyo Dome and Kyocera Dome sold out (300,000 tickets) in 2 minutes.
 2016 Concert (South Korea) - Big Bang at Seoul World Cup Stadium sold out (60,000 tickets) within 30 minutes.
 2012 Concert (Japan) – Super Junior-K.R.Y. at Pacifico Yokohama Convention Center sold out (15,000 tickets) in 3 seconds.
 2012 Concert (UK) – The Stone Roses at Manchester's Heaton Park sold out (220,000 tickets) in 68 minutes.
 2009 Concert (UK) (Cancelled) – Michael Jackson at the O2 Arena sold out (750,000 tickets) in 4 hours.
 2009 Concert (Estonia) – Madonna sold out 70,300 tickets in about 24 hours.
 2009 Tour (Mexico) – Madonna sold out 100,000 tickets in one-hour and fifteen minutes for two concerts.
 2006 Tour (UK) – Robbie Williams sold 1.6 million tickets within 24 hours.
 2001 Tour (UK) – Madonna sold out 97,000 tickets in six hours for six shows at Earls Court Exhibition Centre

Smartphones 
 2014 Samsung Electronics – Galaxy S5 sold 11 million units during the first month of availability.
 2014 Apple Inc. – iPhone 6s pre-orders exceeded 4 million units in 24 hours.
 2012 Apple Inc. – iPhone 5 pre-orders exceeded 2 million in 24 hours of its launch.

Video game systems

Video games

Worldwide

Pre-release

Launch month

1 month to 1 year

Regional

Japan

Europe

United States

Platforms 
 Nintendo game consoles
 2020 (Switch) - Animal Crossing: New Horizons sold 13.41 million copies in its first 6 weeks, with 11.77 million selling in the first 11 days.
 2019 (Switch) – Pokémon Sword and Shield sold 6 million copies worldwide (physical and digital) during their launch weekend, and are among the fastest-selling Nintendo Switch games of all time.
 2018 (Switch) – Super Smash Bros. Ultimate sold 5 million units within its first week, is the fastest-selling Nintendo game of all time and has an all-time high record for launch-month dollars sales for a console exclusive (12 million units sold in 3 weeks).
 2017 (Switch) – Mario Kart 8 Deluxe is considered the fastest selling game in Mario Kart's franchise history with over 1.0 million units sold in its first 3 days (459,000 units in USA in 2 days). 
 2017 (Switch) – Super Mario Odyssey shipped 2 million units in three days.
 2017 (Switch and Wii U) – The Legend of Zelda: Breath of the Wild is considered Nintendo's fastest selling launch title of all time with 1.3 Million units sold in US alone in its first month (925,000 units on Switch and 460,000 units on Wii U).
 2013 (Nintendo 3DS) – Pokémon X and Y selling 4 million units in two days.
 PlayStation and Xbox home consoles
 2018 (PlayStation 4 and Xbox One) – Red Dead Redemption 2 shipped approximately 10 million units within its first three days.
 2018 (PlayStation 4 and Xbox One) – Monster Hunter: World shipped 5 million units in its first three days.
 2016 (PlayStation 4) – Final Fantasy XV shipped 5 million units on its first day.
 2012 (Xbox Live) – Minecraft selling 100,000 units within its first day.
 2012 (PlayStation Network) – Journey is the fastest-selling game ever released in the SCEA region on the PlayStation Network.
 Sega home consoles
 1992 (Mega Drive) – Sonic the Hedgehog 2 sold out  units worldwide within two weeks.
 1991 (Mega Drive) – Sonic the Hedgehog sold  cartridges in just over six months, from late June through December 1991. It went on to sell  cartridges worldwide within nine months, through March 1992.
 Personal computer (PC) systems
 2020 - Cyberpunk 2077 sold 4.72 million pre-ordered PC copies on the first day, becoming the fastest-selling PC game of all time.
 2012 – Diablo III selling 6.3 million units in its first week.
 2011 (Steam) – The Elder Scrolls V: Skyrim sold 10 million units for the PC, PlayStation 3 and Xbox 360 platforms in about a month and 7 million in the first week.
 1997 – Riven (released October 1997) sold 1,003,414 units and grossed  by May 1998.
 1993 – Myst sold 500,000 CD-ROM units within a year.

Other 
 2022 (Soulslike) – Elden Ring sold  copies in 2 weeks.
 2019 (2K Games) – Borderlands 3 sold 5 million units within its first five days, making it the most sold game in 2K Games history.
 2011 (original IP in the United Kingdom) – L.A. Noire becomes fastest-selling original IP in the United Kingdom.

Miscellaneous 
 2014 Jetliner Family – Airbus A320 sold 250 airplanes in one order with list price of $26.6 billion minus discounts.
 2012 Perfume – Lady Gaga Fame by Lady Gaga was the fastest selling perfume after Coco Chanel.
 2011 Jetliner Family – Boeing 737 MAX sold over 900 airplanes from 13 customers during launch with the real market value of the order is estimated at $10.5 billion.

Notes

References 

Lists of products
Records by subject
Retailing-related lists
Sales
Fastest-selling products

Book sources